Gareth Davies (born 11 August 1949) is a Welsh former footballer who played at both professional and international levels as a central defender.

Career
Born in Bangor, Davies played for Llandudno, Colwyn Bay, Wrexham and Lex XI. While at Wrexham, he was Player of the Season during 1977–78.

Davies also played for Wales at under-23 level, and earned three senior international caps for Wales in 1978.

References

1949 births
Living people
Welsh footballers
Wales international footballers
Wales under-23 international footballers
Colwyn Bay F.C. players
Wrexham A.F.C. players
Lex XI F.C. players
English Football League players
Association football defenders